Thebaine 6-O-demethylase (T6ODM) is an enzyme with systematic name thebaine,2-oxoglutarate:oxygen oxidoreductase (6-O-demethylating). This enzyme catalyses the following chemical reaction

 thebaine + 2-oxoglutarate + O2  neopinone + formaldehyde + succinate + CO2

Thebaine 6-O-demethylase contains Fe2+.

References

External links 

EC 1.14.11